The Football League play-offs for the 2006–07 season were held in May 2007, with the finals taking place at Wembley Stadium in London for the first time. The play-off semi-finals will be played over two legs and will contested by the teams who finish in 3rd, 4th, 5th and 6th place in the Football League Championship and League One and the 4th, 5th, 6th and 7th placed teams in the League Two table. The winners of the semi-finals will go through to the finals, with the winner of the matches gaining promotion for the following season.

Background
The Football League play-offs have been held every year since 1987. They take place for each division following the conclusion of the regular season and are contested by the four clubs finishing below the automatic promotion places.

In the Championship, Derby County, who were aiming to return to the top flight for the first time in 5 years, finished 2 points behind second placed Birmingham City, who in turn finished 2 points behind champions Sunderland, who returned to the top flight at the first attempt after relegation from the Premier League last season. West Bromwich Albion who were also relegated from the top flight last season, finished in fourth place in the table. Wolverhampton Wanderers who are aiming to return to the Premiership after a 3-year absence, finished in fifth place. Southampton finished 1 point behind Wolverhampton Wanderers and West Bromwich Albion on 75 points and were looking for a place back in the Premiership after 2 seasons outside the top division.

Championship

Semi-finals
First leg

Second leg

Derby County 4–4 Southampton on aggregate. Derby County won 4–3 on penalties.

West Bromwich Albion won 4–2 on aggregate.

Final

League One

Semi-finals
First leg

Second leg

Yeovil Town won 5–4 on aggregate.

Blackpool won 5–2 on aggregate.

Final

League Two

Semi-finals
First leg

Second leg

Bristol Rovers won 7–4 on aggregate.

Shrewsbury Town won 2–1 on aggregate.

Final

External links
Football League website

 
English Football League play-offs
Football League play-offs